The 2022–23 season is St Johnstone's tenth in the Scottish Premiership and their fourteenth consecutively (following four in the former Scottish Premier League) in the top flight of Scottish football. Saints were eliminated from the League Cup at the group stage. They will also compete in the Scottish Cup. The team is playing under the continued management of Callum Davidson.

Season summary
Still managed by Callum Davidson, Saints hoped to improve upon their performance in the 2021–22 season when, after finishing eleventh, they had to win the Premiership playoff to avoid relegation. The team had been in transition since winning the Scottish Cup in May 2021 and Saints were again very active in the summer transfer window which closed on 31 August. The scale of transition is illustrated by the team which played St Mirren three days later on 3 September. Of the 20-man squad who contested the 2021 Scottish Cup Final just 15 months earlier, only nine players remained at the club in some capacity and only Stevie May was in the starting line-up for the St Mirren match with four others on the bench. Among the summer 2022 intake were Drey Wright and Jamie Murphy who had both played for Hibernian in the 2021 final.

Competitions

Scottish Premiership

Scottish League Cup

Saints entered the 2022–23 Scottish League Cup at the group stage and were drawn into Group F with Annan Athletic, Ayr United, Elgin City and Queen of the South. Despite being reduced to nine men, Saints held on to draw 0–0 in the opening match at home to Annan Athletic but lost the penalty shootout 5–4. They also lost on penalties to Queen of the South after a 2–2 draw. Victories over Elgin City and Ayr United were a case of too little, too late, and Saints were eliminated from the competition after finishing third in Group F. Annan were the surprise group winners and Queen of the South were runners-up ahead of Saints on goal difference. The top two both qualified for the second round (the last 16).

Scottish Cup

Squad statistics

Appearances and goals

|-
! colspan=12 style=background:#dcdcdc; text-align:center| Departures
 

|}

Team statistics

League table

Results by round

Overall record

Transfers

In Scottish football, the summer 2022 transfer window officially opened on 10 June and closed on 31 August.

In

Out

See also
List of St Johnstone F.C. seasons

References

St Johnstone F.C. seasons
St Johnstone